The 2010 Valencia Open 500 was a men's tennis tournament played on indoor hard courts. It was the 16th edition of the Open de Tenis Comunidad Valenciana, and was part of the 500 Series of the 2010 ATP World Tour. It was held at the Ciutat de les Arts i les Ciències in Valencia, Spain, from 31 October through 6 November 2010. Fourth-seeded David Ferrer won the singles title.

ATP players

Seeds

 Seeds are based on the rankings of October 25, 2010 and subject to change

Other entrants
The following players received wildcards into the singles main draw:
  Pablo Andújar
  Roberto Bautista-Agut
  Javier Martí

The following players received entry from the qualifying draw:
  Pablo Cuevas
  Teymuraz Gabashvili
  Benoît Paire
  Michael Russell

The following player received entry as a Lucky loser:
  Marcel Granollers
  Albert Ramos-Viñolas

Finals

Singles

 David Ferrer defeated  Marcel Granollers, 7–5, 6–3
It was Ferrer's 2nd title of the year and 9th of his career. It was his 2nd win at the event, also winning in 2008.

Doubles

 Andy Murray /  Jamie Murray defeated  Mahesh Bhupathi /  Max Mirnyi, 7–6(10–8), 5–7, [10–7]

References

External links
Official website